Dhimitër Shuteriqi (26 July 1915 ‒ 22 July 2003) was an Albanian scholar, literary historian, and writer. He participated in the anti-fascist National Liberation Movement. After the war he was a member of the People's Assembly and one of the founders and later president of the Albanian League of Writers and Artists. In addition to a series of books and novels, he has published numerous volumes of textbooks, especially those of the History of Albanian Literature for high schools.

Life
Dhimitër S. Shuteriqi was born in Elbasan in a patriotic and intellectual family. His father was Simon Shuteriqi, participant in the Literary  Congress of Monastir (1908) and Congress of Elbasan (1909), as well as one of the founders of the Shkolla Normale e Elbasanit.

Shuteriqi attended the secondary school in Korça. He studied at the University of Grenoble and Lyon in France and taught school in Elbasan in 1942–1943. Shuteriqi began writing in the 1930s and was to become an influential literary historian during the socialist period. He was a member of parliament for many years, president of the Albanian League of Writers and Artists (ALWA) from 1950 to 1973, and a member of the Academy of Sciences from 1973. As chairman of the ALWA, he participated in the Albanian Congress of Orthography of 1972 and was one of the signatories. Shuteriqi is remembered for his research in literature, history, and folklore, in particular for his standard histories and anthologies of Albanian literature. Among his works are Shkrimet shqipe në vitet 1332–1850 (Albanian Writing in the Years 1332–1850), Tirana 1976, Autorë dhe tekste (Authors and Texts), Tirana 1977, and Historia e letërsisë shqiptare (History of Albanian Literature), Tirana 1983.

Shuteriqi was also author of prose and poetry. His first poetry was named Kosova and was published in the Kosova newspaper of Albanian community of Constanța, Romania, in 1933. He was inspired by Romanticism (Victor Hugo, Lamartine, De Vigny, Byron, etc.) until 1943 when he switched to Realism, and later Socialist Realism. 

His two-volume Çlirimtarët (The Liberators), Tirana 1952 and 1955, the first post-World War II Albanian novel, painted a picture of the squalor and sufferings of the peasants before the "liberation", and also of the rise of class consciousness among them. It helped set the rather sluggish pace of socialist realism in the 1950s.

Works
Kangët e rinisë së parë (Songs of first youth), Tirana, 1935
Historia e letërsisë shqipe në tre vëllime (History of Albanian literature in three volumes), Tirana, 1959, OCLC  504188502
Metrika shqipe për shkollat e mesme dhe të nalta (Albanian metrics for high schools and universities), Prishtina, 1968, OCLC 504188538
The lute and the rifle, Tirana, 1965, OCLC 29799716 (translated by Ali Cungu)
Mbi krahn' e praruar të paqës. Poem dhe vjersha të tjera (Over the golden wings of peace), Tirana, 1950, OCLC 504188548
Récits, Tirana, 1969, OCLC 25242468
Antologjia e letërsisë shqipe për shkollat e mesme (Anthology of Albanian literatury for high schools), Tirana, 1955, OCLC 792785485, Prishtina, 1970, OCLC 42419307
Shkrimet shqipe në vitet 1332–1850 (Albanian Writing in the Years 1332–1850), Tirana, 1976, OCLC 4167459
Mësuesit dhe Atit: Poezi dhe prozë shqipe kushtuar emrit të J.V.Stalinit (To the teacher and father: Poetry and prose dedicated to the name of J.V.Stalin) (as editor), Tirana, 1953, OCLC 468906251
Vepra (Work), as editor, author: Andon Zako, Tirana, 1957, OCLC 557917931
Sytë e Simonidës : pluhurat e shenjtëruar (The eyes of Simonida: the holy dusts), Tirana, 1998, OCLC 41002334
Tekstet shqipe dhe shkrimi i shqipes në vitet 879–1800 (Albanian text and writing of Albanian language in the years 879–1800), Tirana, 2005, 
Këngë në minierë : tregime dhe përshkrime (Songs in the mines: stories and narrations), Tirana, 1968, OCLC 23925590
Naim Frashëri, jeta dhe vepra (Naim Frashëri, life and work), Tirana, 1982, OCLC 23767244
Aranitët (Aranites), Tirana, 2011,  (Prepared by Zana Shuteriqi Prela)
Marin Beçikemi dhe shkrime të tjera (Marin Beçikemi and other writings), Tirana, 1987, OCLC 28931320
Le Chant et le fusil. (Récits), Tirana, 1963, OCLC 32411583
Maratonomaku ynë : tregime (Our Maratonian : stories), Tirana, 1977, OCLC 18981763
Çlirimtarët (Liberators), Tirana, 1952, 1955
Ura në Tepelenë (Bridge in Tepelena), Prishtina, 1979, OCLC 17274535
Autorë dhe tekste (Authors and Texts), Tirana, 1977, OCLC 15286239
Deshmi parabuzukjane të fjalës shqipe (Pre-Buzukian testimonies of Albanian words), Tirana, 2010, 
Këngë (Songs), Tirana, 1961, OCLC 36250360
Petro Korçari, kryearkitekt i Ali Pashë Tepelenës (Petro Korçari, chief-architect of Ali Pashe Tepelena), Tirana, 1978, OCLC 18107084
Shpati i Sipërm: gjurmime rreth kulturës popullore (Shpati i Sipërm: research on the folkloric culture), (as co-author), Tirana, 1987, OCLC 18588537
Gjurmime letrare (Literary research), Tirana, 1974, OCLC 54162415
Vërshimet e vjeshtës (Autumn floods), Tirana, 1984, OCLC 18225289
Nga kënga e popullit (From people's song), Tirana, 1991, OCLC 40498914
Buka dhe thika: tregime të zgjedhura (Bread and knife: selected stories), Tirana, 2002, 
Si atë ditën e parë: poezi (Like that first day: poetry), Tirana, 1984, OCLC 18224377
Rruga e Rinise (Youth's way), Tirana, 1953, OCLC 43138928
Nëpër shekujt letrarë : studime (Through the literary centuries: studies), Tirana, 1973, OCLC 24372993
Moti i madh: përmbledhje shënimesh e dokumentesh për historinë shqiptare të viteve 1379–1479 (The big year: collection of notes and documents for the Albanian history of years 1379–1479), Tirana, 2006, 
Poezia shqipe: nga origjinat e gjer më sot (Albanian poetry: from its origin till today), Tirana, 1965, OCLC 43143845
Një mal me këngë (A mountain of songs), Tirana, 1975, OCLC 5733202
Kënga dhe pushka: tregime (Song and rifle: stories), Tirana, 1963, OCLC 28785438
Te qafa e botës: tregime (At the neck of the world: stories), Tirana, 1986, OCLC 17769145
Gurnecka: tregime (Gurnecka: stories), Tirana, 1957, OCLC 660244021
Fyelli i Marsiasit, dhe tregime të tjera (Marsias flute and other stories), Tirana, 1953, OCLC 80732707
Kur rendte hëna nëpër re: tregime (When the moon was hovering through the clouds: stories), Tirana, 1982, OCLC 157033085
Pesë tregime (Five stories), Tirana, 1953, OCLC 252881071
Historia e letërsisë shqiptare: që nga fillimet deri te Lufta Antifashiste Nacionalçlirimtare (History of Albanian literature: from the start till the National Liberation Anti-Fascist War) (as co-author), Tirana, 1983, OCLC 14167733
60 tregime ne nje (60 stories in one), Tirana, 1979, OCLC 832605712
Mbi Barletin dhe shkrime të tjera (On Barleti and other writings), Tirana, 1979, OCLC 63333127
Andon Zako-Çajupi – biography (conference material), Tirana, 1950, OCLC 52763695

See also
Skënder Luarasi
Robert Shvarc
Sejfulla Malëshova

References

Further reading
Dhimitër S. Shuteriqi, Feride Papleka, Academy of Science of Albania, 2010, 

Albanian male poets
1915 births
2003 deaths
People from Elbasan
Socialist realism writers
20th-century Albanian poets
21st-century Albanian poets
Albanian male writers
21st-century Albanian writers
Labour Party of Albania politicians
Members of the Parliament of Albania
20th-century Albanian politicians
20th-century Albanian educators
Albanian schoolteachers
University of Lyon alumni
Grenoble Alpes University alumni
Albanian folklorists
20th-century Albanian historians
Members of the Academy of Sciences of Albania
Eastern Orthodox Christians from Albania
Albanian philologists
20th-century philologists
Academic staff of the University of Elbasan
Albanian male short story writers
Albanian short story writers
Albanian novelists
Male novelists
20th-century novelists